Moussa El-Ezam (died 1960) was an Egyptian footballer. He competed in the men's tournament at the 1928 Summer Olympics.

References

External links
 
 

Year of birth missing
1960 deaths
Egyptian footballers
Egypt international footballers
Olympic footballers of Egypt
Footballers at the 1928 Summer Olympics
Place of birth missing
Association football forwards
Al Masry SC players